Les Bourgeois Winery and Vineyards,  Missouri's third largest winery, is in Rocheport, Missouri in the Columbia Metropolitan Area.  The winery produces over 120,000 gallons of wine a year, sold locally as well as distributed through the Midwest.  Properties owned by the company include a  resort area with vineyards, a restaurant, an A-frame and casual picnic/outdoor wine garden atop the Manitou Bluffs overlooking the Missouri River, and a  production facility.

See also
List of wineries in Missouri
Missouri wine
Missouri Rhineland
Norton (grape)

References

External links
Official website

Buildings and structures in Boone County, Missouri
Wineries in Missouri
Missouri Rhineland
Tourist attractions in Boone County, Missouri